The enzyme maleate hydratase catalyzes the chemical reaction

(R)-malate  maleate + H2O

This enzyme belongs to the family of lyases, specifically the hydro-lyases, which cleave carbon-oxygen bonds.  The systematic name of this enzyme class is (R)-malate hydro-lyase (maleate-forming). Other names in common use include D-malate hydro-lyase, malease, and (R)-malate hydro-lyase.  This enzyme participates in butanoate metabolism.

References

 
 

EC 4.2.1
Enzymes of unknown structure